Soulshock & Cutfather was a Danish production duo active in the late 1980s and early 1990s, made up of Carsten Schack, better known as Soulshock, and Mich Hedin Hansen, better known as Cutfather.

They formed a producer and DJ duo making a name by remixing for Danish artists such as Lis Sørensen ("Mine øjne de skal se"), Cut'N'Move ("Get Serious" and "Spread Love"), Laid Back ("Bakerman") and Back to Back ("Jonathan"). In 1990, they together started a record label, Soulpower Productions, as part of Medley Records, where they particularly produced Yasmin and Cut'N'Move. Several times they won mixing championships produced  for Queen Latifah and Ultra Naté.

The duo collaboration ended with Carsten Schack immigrating to the United States and soon after forming the duo Soulshock & Karlin with Kenneth Karlin.

Carsten Schack and Mich Hansen have both been judges on the Danish X Factor, Carsten "Soulshock" Schack in season 3 (2010) and Mich "Cutfather" Hansen in season 4 (2011) and season 5 (2012).

See also
Soulshock
Soulshock & Karlin
Cutfather

References

External links
Soulshock * Cutfather at Discogs

Danish record producers
Danish songwriters
Record production duos
Songwriting teams
Danish musical duos